If You Saw Thro' My Eyes is the 1971 album by country rock/folk rock musician Ian Matthews. It was the first of two Ian Matthews solo albums released on Vertigo, a subsidiary label of Philips/Phonogram (the second being Tigers Will Survive  released in 1972). Guest musicians were former Fairport Convention bandmates Sandy Denny on vocals and keyboards, and Richard Thompson on accordion and guitar. The album also featured guitarist Tim Renwick, jazz pianist Keith Tippett and Matthews' future bandmate in Plainsong, Andy Roberts.

The second track on the album, ‘Hearts’, was released as a single on April 23, 1971; the album itself (catalogue number VEL-1002) was released worldwide on May 1 that year.

If You Saw Thro' My Eyes remained unavailable on CD until 1993 when it was released as a 2-on-1 reissue on Vertigo coupled with Tigers Will Survive.
The original album on its own was remastered and reissued on CD in 2003 on MK2 Records. It has since been reissued again several times, the most recent version being in 2012 on Esoteric Records.

A live version of the album, If You Saw Thro' My Eyes - Live, recorded in October 2003 at Cambrinus Cafe in Horst, The Netherlands (where Matthews now lives), was released as the second CD of the 2-CD set Sparkler: The Best of the Texas Recordings 1989-2004 on the Blue Rose record label.

Track listing
(All tracks composed by Ian Matthews except where noted)
"Desert Inn" – 3:29
"Hearts" – 3:01
"Never Ending" – 2:52 
"Reno Nevada"  (Richard Fariña) – 4:47 
"Little Known" – 2:50
"Hinge I" – 1:20
"Hinge II" – 1:10  
"Southern Wind"  – 3:10
"It Came Without Warning" (Jerry Burnham, Allan Jacobs) – 3:45
"You Couldn't Lose" – 3:35
"Morgan The Pirate"  (Fariña) – 6:42
"Thro' My Eyes" – 2:37

Charts

Personnel
Ian Matthews - guitar, vocals
Sandy Denny - piano, harmonium, vocals
Richard Thompson - electric and acoustic guitar, accordion
Pat Donaldson - bass
Andy Roberts - acoustic guitar
Tim Renwick - electric and acoustic guitar
Gerry Conway - drums
Keith Tippett - piano on "Never Ending" and "Southern Wind"
Doris Troy, Liza Strike and Nanette Workman - backing vocals on "Southern Wind"

Production
Producer: Ian Matthews
Recording Engineer: Robin Black at Morgan Studios, London
Art Direction: Design Machine
Photography: Steve Hiett

References

Iain Matthews albums
1971 albums
Vertigo Records albums
Albums produced by Iain Matthews
Albums recorded at Morgan Sound Studios